Oleksandr Usyk vs Derek Chisora, billed as Fright Night, was a professional boxing match contested between former undisputed cruiserweight champion and the WBO's heavyweight mandatory challenger, Oleksandr Usyk, and WBO Inter-Continental heavyweight champion, Derek Chisora. The bout took place on 31 October 2020 at The SSE Arena, with Usyk winning by unanimous decision.

Background
Usyk became the first ever four-belt undisputed cruiserweight champion in 2018 after winning the World Boxing Super Series tournament. Following his victory over Tony Bellew later in the year, Usyk made the decision to move up to the heavyweight division in 2019. Usyk made his heavyweight debut against late replacement Chazz Witherspoon, with Uysk winning by corner retirement in the seventh round.

Chisora regained composure following a loss against Whyte in December 2018, going on a 3-fight winning streak in 2019. Scoring a UD victory over Senad Gashi in April, and a second round KO over former world title challenger Artur Szpilka in July, a fight in which Usyk was in attendance. In the post-fight interview, after defeating David Price in October, Chisora's manager, David Haye, commented on a potential fight with Usyk next.

On 11 March 2020, it was announced that Usyk and Chisora would fight on 23 May 2020 at The O2 Arena in London, live on Sky Sports Box Office. The fight was rescheduled to 31 October 2020 due to the COVID-19 pandemic, and the venue was moved to the SSE Arena.

The fight
From the opening bell, Chisora started a fast pace, attempting to close the distance and apply sustained pressure, landing hooks to the body on the inside, and forcing Usyk to be backed up against the ropes, with Usyk boxing at range defensively. As the early rounds progressed, Chisora continued to fight aggressively on the front foot, maintaining a high work rate, with Usyk landing clean straight left hands and quick counters on the back foot. In the middle rounds, Usyk was able to control the pace, using his superior movement and footwork to lead with solid jabs and land combination punches from angles on the outside, outboxing Chisora and escaping his attacks. In the later rounds, Chisora upped his output and remained on the offensive, pressing forward and successfully landing a series of hard right hands and body shots, with Usyk responding with several heavy flurries and scoring stiff blows repeatedly. All three judges unanimously scored the fight in favour of Usyk, with scores of 117-112, 115-113 and 115-113.

Aftermath
Following Usyk's win, in the post-fight interview, Usyk said "Anthony, how are you? I'm coming for you, Anthony."

Usyk defeated Joshua on 25 September, by unanimous decision to capture the unified WBA (Super), IBF, WBO and IBO titles.

Fight card 

<small>

Broadcasting

References 

Boxing matches
Boxing matches involving Oleksandr Usyk
2020 in boxing
2020 in British sport
October 2020 sports events in the United Kingdom
2020 sports events in London